The Azerbaijan Hope Party is an Azerbaijani political party, officially registered in 1993. In December 2002, a faction of the Civic Unity Party (CUP) led by Igbal Agazade split from CUP and joined the Party of Hope. On December 15, 2002, during the party's congress, Igbal Agazade became the chairman of the Party of Hope.
During the 2003 Presidential Elections in Azerbaijan, the Party of Hope played a major role in holding numerous meetings in Baku as well as in different regions of Azerbaijan. Party and its leader were together with voters on election day and came forward against the numerous cases of voter suppression, and on October 16, when voters protested against falsification of election results. On October 17, leader of Umid (Hope) Party was deprived his parliamentary immunity and was arrested with members of his family, his advocate and journalists.

Igbal Agazadeh and other representatives of opposition that were sentenced to 3 year in prison according to the decision of the criminal Court were granted the amnesty by the edict of President on March 20, 2005, in the result of insistence of international organizations. In Parliamentary elections in 2005, 30 candidates represented Umid (Hope) Party. Although mass falsification of results, some candidates from opposition could get the trust of voters and become deputies of Milli Majlis. One of them was the leader of Umid (Hope) Party.

The Umid Party is a party of the centre right  and supports a liberal and democratic society in Azerbaijan. Party has regional branches in 65 regions of Azerbaijan and more than 55,000 members.

Azerbaijani democracy movements
Political parties in Azerbaijan
Political parties established in 1993